This is a list of notable schools in the African country of Ghana.

A
 Aburi Girls’ Senior High School, Aburi, Eastern Region
 Accra Academy, in  Kaneshie, Greater Accra Region
 Aburi Secondary Technical School, in Aburi, Eastern Region
 Adisadel College, in Cape Coast, Central Region
 Adonten Senior High School [Aburi] [Eastern Region]
 Aggrey Memorial A.M.E. Zion Senior High School, in Cape Coast, Central Region
 Akosombo International School, in Akosombo, Eastern Region
 Anamon Hyeren Standard School, in Tutuka, Obuasi Municipal District, Ashanti Region
 Anglican Senior High School, in Kumasi, Ashanti Region
 Axim Girls Senior High School
 Antoa Senior High School, in Kwabre East Municipal
Akim Swedru Senior High School, Akim Swedru, Eastern Region
 Afadjato Secondary Technical School, Gbledi Gbogame, Volta Region

B 
Barekese Senior High School, in Barekese, Ashanti Region 
 Bimbilla Senior High School
 Bishop Herman College, in Kpando, Volta Region
 Boa Amponsem Senior High School, in Dunkwa-on-Offin, Central Region
 Bolgatanga Girls Senior High School
 Bompeh Senior High Technical School, in Sekondi-Takoradi, Western Region

D
 Dahin Sheli School
 Delhi Public School

G

 Galaxy International School, Accra
 Gambaga Girls Senior High School
 German Swiss International School Accra
 Ghana Institute of Journalism, Osu Ringway, Accra
 Ghana International School
 Ghanata Senior High School, Dodowa, Gt. Accra
 Ghana-Lebanon Islamic School (GLIS)

H

 Holy Trinity Cathedral Senior High School, High Street-Accra

K
 Koforidua Senior High Technical School
 KNUST Senior High School, in Kumasi, Ashanti Region
 Kumasi Academy, in Kumasi, Ashanti Region
 Kumasi Wesley Girls' High School
 Oyoko Methodist Senior High School, in Koforidua
 Kumasi High, Kumasi, Ashanti Region
 Konongo Odumasi Senior High School
Krobo Girls Senior High School
Keta Senior Secondary School
Dabala Secondary Technical School

L

 Lycée Français d'Accra
 Labone Senior High School
 Learning Skills International School

M

 Mawuli School, Ho
 MEST Africa, Accra
 Methodist Girls Senior High School
 Methodist Senior High School, Saltpond, Central Region
 Mfantsipim School, in Cape Coast (established in 1876 as Methodist "Wesleyan High School")
 Mim Senior High School, in Mim, Brong-Ahafo Region
 Mpraeso Secondary School

O

 Odorgonno Senior High School
 Ofori Panin Senior High School
 Okuapeman Senior High School
 OLA Girls Senior High School (Ho)
 OLA Girls Senior High School (Kenyasi)
 Osei Kyeretwie Secondary School

P

 Pentecost University College
 Pope John Senior High School and Minor Seminary, Koforidua, Eastern Region
 Presbyterian Boys' Secondary, in Legon, Accra

Presbyterian Senior High School Osu Accra
Presbyterian Senior High Technical School Aburi

Prince of Peace Girls Senior High School, South Suntreso, Kumasi

Q
 Queen of Apostles Boarding School, in Elmina, Central Region

R

 Regent University College of Science and Technology
 Ridge Church School

S

 Serwaa Kesse Girls' Senior High School
 St. Augustine's College (Cape Coast)
 St. Louis Secondary
 St. Mary's Senior High School
 St. Peter's Mission Schools (Day & Boarding), in Accra
 St. Peter's Boys Senior High School

T

 Tamale Girls Secondary School
 Tamale Technical University (TaTU)
 Tema International School

U
 University of Education, Winneba, in Winneba, Central Region
 University of Ghana, in Legon, Greater Accra Region
 University of Ghana Primary School Legon, in Legon, Greater Accra Region
 George Grant University of Mines and Technology, in Tarkwa, Western Region
 Kwame Nkrumah University of Science and Technology, in Kumasi, Ashanti Region

W
 Wesley Girls' High School, in Cape Coast, Central Region

See also

 Education in Ghana
 List of Senior High Schools in Ghana

References

External links
 Complete Ghana School List (Includes Universities and Colleges)
 Ghana Schools on ModernGhana.com

Schools
Schools
Schools
Ghana
Ghana